The 2017 TCR International Series Hungaroring round was the sixth round of the 2017 TCR International Series season. It took place on 18 June at the Hungaroring.

Attila Tassi won both races starting from third position in Race 1 and eighth position in Race 2, driving a Honda Civic Type-R TCR.

Ballast
Due to the results obtained in the previous round, Stefano Comini received +, Dušan Borković + and both Roberto Colciago and Thomas Jäger +. Nevertheless, Jäger didn't take part at this event, so he didn't take the ballast. 

The SEAT León TCRs and Volkswagen Golf GTI TCRs was also given a weight break, going down -10 kg.

Classification

Qualifying

Notes
 — Stefano Comini, Jean-Karl Vernay, Robert Huff, Roberto Colciago, Frédéric Vervisch, Attila Tassi, Gianni Morbidelli, Jens Reno Møller, Davit Kajaia, István Bernula, James Nash, Norbert Michelisz, Dušan Borković, Maťo Homola and Pepe Oriola all had their best laptimes deleted during Q1, for not respecting the track limits.
 — Roberto Colciago, Attila Tassi, Daniel Lloyd, and Pepe Oriola all had their best laptimes deleted during Q2, for not respecting the track limits.
 — Frédéric Vervisch and Ferenc Ficza was sent to the back of the grid for Race 1, after an engine change. Which in Ficza's case was a car change, a penalty he carried over from the Salzburgring round after Ficza's car was withdrawn from the event after a crash in Free Practice.
 — Maťo Homola was excluded from qualifying and therefore had all his qualifying times deleted, after his car was found to not conform to the homologation form.

Race 1

Notes
 — Ferenc Ficza was giving a 30 sec. penalty post race, after he had lined up in the wrong grid position.

Race 2

Notes
 — Duncan Ende and István Bernula was both sent to the back of the grid, for having broken parc fermé after Race 1.

Standings after the event

Drivers' Championship standings

Model of the Year standings

Teams' Championship standings

 Note: Only the top five positions are included for both sets of drivers' standings.

References

External links
TCR International Series official website

Hungaroring
TCR International Series
TCR Hungaroring